Longlane may be:

 Longlane, Berkshire, England
 Longlane, Derbyshire, England
 Longlane, Missouri a small unincorporated village in Missouri, approximate population of 50, located in Dallas County, 40 miles north of Springfield Missouri, United States

See also 
 Long Lane (disambiguation)